Momversation is a website and online video series produced by DECA, the Digital Entertainment Corporation of America. The show, which officially launched on November 12, 2008, consists of mom bloggers discussing issues pertinent to women and parenting.

References

Further reading
 
 
 
 
 "DECA Launches Web Property Momversation". Reuters. 
 CNN Video: Kids and the Economy
 NY Times Motherlode: What's Harder, Marriage or Parenting?
 PBS.org POV: Mommy Talk. Mommy Listen?

External links

Writers of blogs about home and family
American women's websites